The Legend of the Condor Heroes is a 2017 Chinese television series adapted from Louis Cha's novel of the same title and a remake of the 1983 Hong Kong television series based on the same novel. The series was directed by Jeffrey Chiang and starred Yang Xuwen, Li Yitong, Chen Xingxu and Meng Ziyi in the lead roles. It started airing on Dragon TV in mainland China on 9 January 2017, and on TVB Jade in Hong Kong on 8 May 2017.

Cast

Main
 Yang Xuwen as Guo Jing
 Dong-Li Wuyou as Guo Jing (child)
 Li Yitong as Huang Rong  
 Chen Xingxu as Yang Kang
 Meng Ziyi as Mu Nianci

Supporting
 Zhao Lixin as Hong Qigong
 Michael Miu as Huang Yaoshi
 Ray Lui as Reverend Yideng
 Heizi as Ouyang Feng
 Ning Wentong as Zhou Botong
 Han Dong as Wang Chongyang
 Li Zonghan as Yang Tiexin
 Liu Qianhan as Bao Xiruo
 Shao Bing as Guo Xiaotian
 Zeng Li as Li Ping
 Zong Fengyan as Wanyan Honglie
 Mi Lu as Mei Chaofeng
 Liu Zhiyang as Ouyang Ke
 Tay Ping Hui as Genghis Khan
 Hou Ruixiang as Tolui
 Zhang Zihao as Tolui (child)
 Dai Wenwen as Huazheng
 Fu Tianjiao as Jebe
 Nuomin Darong as Jochi
 Ailiku as Chagatai
 Baodi as Ögedei
 Sulide as Borokhula
 Anqi'er as Muqali
 Hongtong Batu as Jamukha
 Wurijitu as Wang Khan
 Baisha as Sangkun
 Gangde'er as Dushi
 Gao Yuyang as Dushi (child)
 Shao Feng as Qiu Chuji
 Wang Li as Ma Yu
 Guo Jun as Wang Chuyi
 Zhao Qiusheng as Tan Chuduan
 Liu Wei as Hao Datong
 Song Tao as Liu Chuxuan
 Zhao Cong as Sun Bu'er
 Wang Kuirong as Ke Zhen'e
 Ji Chenmu as Zhu Cong
 Wang Chunyuan as Han Baoju
 Ma Jingjing as Nan Xiren
 Xin Peng as Zhang Asheng
 Long De as Quan Jinfa
 Xiao Yin as Han Xiaoying
 Zhang Kaiyi as Yinggu
 Jiang Yiming as Qiu Qianren / Qiu Qianzhang
 Xia Zitong as Shagu
 Li Yixiao as Feng Heng
 Gong Zhengnan as Lu Guanying
 Sui Yumeng as Cheng Yaojia
 Song Qing as Lu Youjiao
 Chang Cheng as Lu Chengfeng
 Zhang Jialai as Chen Xuanfeng
 Wang Lin as Yin Zhiping
 Ren Xihong as Lingzhi Shangren
 Gao Yuqing as Liang Ziweng
 Lin Yizheng as Sha Tongtian
 Gu Dechao as Hou Tonghai
 Sun Hao as Peng Lianhu
 Yu Ailei as Duan Tiande
 Hou Tongjiang as Reverend Kumu
 Cao Yang as Wanyan Hongxi
 Hu Bo as Chu Dongshan
 Zhang Lu as Zhang Shaoshou
 Yin Shuo as Wu Santong
 Liang Jinshan as Zhu Ziliu
 Lu Senbao as Elder Peng
 Fan Zhonghua as Elder Jian
 Liu Yu as Elder Liang
 Jia Jin as Ma Qingxiong
 Liu Taotao as Qian Qingjian
 Zhao Shuai as Wu Qinglie
 Fan Jianyun as Shen Qinggang
 Xu Qihang as Yu Zhaoxing
 He Guoxuan as Li Sheng
 Cheng Liuyi as Muhammad II of Khwarezm
 Yang Yongwen as Lü Wende

Production
The series was filmed primarily at the Xiangshan Film and Television City in Xiangshan County, Zhejiang Province. Shooting wrapped up in late August 2016. Other filming locations include Hengdian World Studios, Xiandu Scenic Area in Jinyun County and Xianju County in Zhejiang Province, Huanghe Shilin Scenic Area in Jingtai County and Tianzhu Grasslands in Gansu Province, and Tonghu Grasslands in Inner Mongolia. Although this series is one of many television series adaptations of The Legend of the Condor Heroes, it is the first one to be produced since Louis Cha last revised the novel.

In a January 2017 interview, producer Guo Jingyu explained why he produced a television series based on a wuxia novel which already has more than 10 earlier adaptations. He said that he is dissatisfied with many of the wuxia television series produced in recent years, and wanted to remake the 1983 Hong Kong television series The Legend of the Condor Heroes, which he enjoyed watching, for younger generations of viewers. He also explained the challenges he faced in operating with a very tight budget and time constraints, such as having to reduce the use of special effects and having to cast less well-known actors and actresses in the lead roles.

Episodes 

The series originally aired in 2 episodes daily on Dragon Television, Monday through Sunday from 19:30 to 21:00.

Ratings

International broadcast

Awards and nominations

Soundtrack 
 Tie Xue Dan Xin (铁血丹心, A Bulletproof Heart): The opening and ending theme song of the series, composed by Joseph Koo and originally the opening theme song of the 1983 Hong Kong television series The Legend of the Condor Heroes. Although the original version was sung in Cantonese by Roman Tam and Jenny Tseng, the version used in The Legend of the Condor Heroes (2017) is an instrumental version with no lyrics.
 Ai Guo Shei (爱过谁, Loved Who): An insert song composed by Silence Wong and sung by Shang Wenjie.
 Jianghu Tianxia (江湖天下, The Pugilistic World): An insert song composed by Tan Xiaocong and sung by Silence Wong.
 Jian Hun (剑魂, Soul of the Sword): An insert song composed by Silence Wong and sung by Well Lee.
 Sei Diu Ying Hung (射鵰英雄, Legend of the Condor Heroes): The opening theme song of the TVB release, sung by Hubert Wu (not confirm).
 Ngo Bat KWai Hei (我不歸去, I Won't Return): The ending theme song of the TVB release, sung by Kayee Tam.

References

External links 
 

2017 Chinese television series debuts
Television shows based on The Legend of the Condor Heroes
Chinese wuxia television series
Mandarin-language television shows
Television series set in the Southern Song
Television series set in the Jin dynasty (1115–1234)
Television series set in the Mongol Empire
Dragon Television original programming
Television series by Croton Media
Television series by Perfect World Pictures
Depictions of Genghis Khan on television